Arabella Goddard (12 January 18366 April 1922) was an English pianist.

She was born and died in France.  Her parents, Thomas Goddard, an heir to a Salisbury cutlery firm, and Arabella née Ingles, were part of an English community of expatriates living in Saint-Servan near Saint-Malo, Brittany. She remained very proud of her French background all her life, and spiced her conversation with French phrases .

At age six she was sent to Paris to study with Friedrich Kalkbrenner.  She was feted as a child prodigy and played for the French royal family and Frédéric Chopin and George Sand (she would later also play for Queen Victoria).  Her family suffered financial distress during the 1848 Revolution and had to return to England; there, Arabella had further lessons with Lucy Anderson and Sigismond Thalberg.  She first appeared in public in 1850, under the conductor Michael William Balfe, at a Grand National Concert at Her Majesty's Theatre.

Thalberg sent her to be tutored by James William Davison, the chief music critic for The Times.  She made her formal debut on 14 April 1853, playing Beethoven's "Hammerklavier" Sonata, the first time the work had been performed in England.  She spent 1854 and 1855 in Germany and Italy.  She played at a concert at the Leipzig Gewandhaus and was very favourably received by the German critics.

She was one of the first pianists to play recitals from memory, although her concerto appearances were with the score in front.

Goddard returned to England and gave concerts with the Philharmonic Society at the Crystal Palace and at the Monday Popular Concerts.  In 1857 and 1858 she played all the late Beethoven sonatas in London, most of which were still complete novelties to her audiences, and many other works.

In 1859 she married her mentor J. W. Davison.  She was 23, he 46. In 1871 she was in the first group of recipients of the Gold Medal of the Royal Philharmonic Society.

From 1873 to 1876 she conducted a major tour, organised by Robert Sparrow Smythe, of the United States, Canada, Australia, New Zealand, India, Shanghai, Hong Kong, Singapore and Java.  In America, the critics were less impressed by her playing of romantic music, but liked her classical playing.  This may have been due to Davison's influence on her: he did not approve of any composers after Mendelssohn. In June 1874, while returning to Townsville, Queensland, from Java, her ship was wrecked, and she had to spend a night in an open boat in torrential rain with Charles Blondin, who was also arriving for an Australian tour.  In October 1875, she appeared in New York City with Thérèse Tietjens.

In England, George Bernard Shaw was struck by her ability to play the most complex pieces.  He described Teresa Carreño as "a second Arabella Goddard".  She retired from performing in 1880.

She was appointed a teacher at the Royal College of Music in 1883, its first year of operation.

A number of composers dedicated pieces to her, including William Sterndale Bennett's Piano Sonata in A-flat, Op. 46 "The Maid of Orleans".  She herself composed a small number of piano pieces, including a suite of six waltzes.

After the birth of her two sons Henry and Charles, she separated from her husband, who died in 1885.  She died at Boulogne-sur-Mer, France, on 6 April 1922, aged 86.

Sources
 Grove's Dictionary of Music and Musicians, 5th ed, 1954

References

1836 births
1922 deaths
English classical pianists
English women pianists
Academics of the Royal College of Music
Piano pedagogues
19th-century classical pianists
Royal Philharmonic Society Gold Medallists
19th-century British women musicians
Women music educators
19th-century English women
19th-century English people
19th-century women pianists